Edward J. Connelly (October 10, 1876 – December 28, 1960) was an American military officer during World War I. He would later serve in the Massachusetts House of Representatives.

Early life
Connelly was born on October 10, 1876, in Chelsea, Massachusetts. His family later moved to Wakefield, Massachusetts and he graduated from Wakefield High School.

Military career
Connelly enlisted as a private in the Massachusetts Volunteer Militia, which saw action in Puerto Rico during the Spanish–American War. He later served in the 104th Infantry Regiment, where he rose to the rank of captain. Shortly after the Armistice was signed, Connelly was severely wounded. He was awarded the Croix de guerre and was presented with the Distinguished Flying Cross by General John J. Pershing.

Post-military career
After he returned home, Connelly established the People's Clothing Store in Wakefield. He was also incorporator of the Wakefield Savings Bank and a director of the Wakefield Chamber of Commerce and the Wakefield Cooperative Bank.

Connelly was involved in politics as well. He served on Wakefield's Finance Board and was a member of Massachusetts House of Representatives from 1935 to 1937.

Connelly was a founder of the local American Legion post and was also a member of the Veterans of Foreign Wars, United Spanish War Veterans, Yankee Division Veterans Association, Benevolent and Protective Order of Elks, Knights of Columbus, and Ancient Order of Hibernians.

Death and legacy
Connelly died on December 28, 1960, in Wakefield. Wakefield's Connelly Park and the Edward J. Connelly Criminal Justice Training Center in Agawam, Massachusetts are named after Connelly.

See also
 1935–1936 Massachusetts legislature

References

1876 births
1960 deaths
Democratic Party members of the Massachusetts House of Representatives
People from Chelsea, Massachusetts
People from Wakefield, Massachusetts
Recipients of the Croix de Guerre 1914–1918 (France)
Recipients of the Distinguished Flying Cross (United States)
United States Army colonels
Military personnel from Massachusetts